Halayudha (Sanskrit: हलायुध) was a 10th-century Indian mathematician who wrote the , a commentary on Pingala's Chandaḥśāstra. The latter contains a clear description of Pascal's triangle (called meru-prastāra).

Biography 

Halayudha originally resided at the Rashtrakuta capital Manyakheta, where he wrote under the patronage of emperor Krishna III. His Kavi-Rahasya eulogizes Krishna III. Later, he migrated to Ujjain in the Paramara kingdom. There, he composed Mṛta-Sañjīvanī in honour of the Paramara king Munja.

Works 

Halayudha composed the following works:

 Kavi-Rahasya, a book on poetics
 Mṛta-Sañjīvanī, a commentary on Pingala's Chandaḥ-śāstra
 Abhidhana-ratna-mala, a lexicon
 Halāyudha Kośa, a dictionary
 He seems to be the first person who came out with the idea of what is today called Pascal's triangle, which he called the staircase of mount Meru.

See also
Indian mathematicians

References

Bibliography 
History of Rashtakutas

 

10th-century Indian mathematicians
Paramara kingdom
Indian Sanskrit scholars